Iván Ernesto Salazar Aleijon (born 28 January 1998) is an Argentine soccer-player who plays as a midfielder for Plaza Colonia in the Uruguayan Primera División.

Career

Plaza Colonia
A graduate of the club's youth academy, Salazar made his league debut on 8 September 2018, scoring in a 1-1 draw with Oriental. Prior to the 2021 season, he and several teammates tested positive for COVID-19, causing him to miss the club's opening match of the season against Torque.

Career statistics

Club

References

External links
Profile at Football Database

1998 births
Living people
Plaza Colonia players
Uruguayan Primera División players
Uruguayan Segunda División players
Argentine footballers
Association football midfielders